"Redemption" is a song by English musical duo Hurts from their fifth studio album, Faith (2020). It was released on July 16, 2020 as the third single from the album. The duo wrote and produced the song. The track became an unexpected radio hit in Russia, where it reached number one in April 2021.

Composition 
Regarding the song, Theo Hutchcraft declared to NME: “It’s a song about fear and doubt. It emerged as a beautiful moment of clarity during one of the most troubled periods of making the album.” For the same publication, Adam Anderson called the track “a perfect storm of everything we do well individually, coming together in one moment”.

Track listing
Digital download
"Redemption" – 4:18

Digital download – Kolya Funk Remix
"Redemption"  – 2:39

Charts

Weekly charts

Year-end charts

Release history

References

2020 singles
2020 songs
Hurts songs
Number-one singles in Russia
Songs written by Theo Hutchcraft